Kruszka may refer to the following places:
Kruszka, Greater Poland Voivodeship (west-central Poland)
Kruszka, Kuyavian-Pomeranian Voivodeship (north-central Poland)
Kruszka, Pomeranian Voivodeship (north Poland)